The year 1742 in architecture involved some significant events.

Buildings and structures

Buildings

 Azm Palace (Hama), Syria, built.
 Hôtel de Caumont, Aix-en-Provence, designed by Robert de Cotte (d.1735) and Georges Vallon, completed.
 Kozłówka Palace, Poland, designed by Józef Fontana II, completed.
 Palace of Portici, Italy, designed by Antonio Canevari, completed.
 Palais Rohan, Strasbourg, Alsace, designed by Robert de Cotte, completed.
 Malplaquet House, east London, England, built.
 Berlin Court Opera, designed by Georg Wenzeslaus von Knobelsdorff, inaugurated.
 Queen Mary Court at Greenwich Hospital, London, planned by Wren (d.1723) and Hawksmoor (d.1736), completed by Thomas Ripley.
 Redland Chapel, Bristol, England, designed probably by John Strahan or William Halfpenny, built.

Publications
 Batty Langley publishes Ancient Architecture Restored in England, a pioneering pattern book for Gothic Revival architecture.

Births
 March 13 – Karl Friedrich Schinkel, Prussian architect (died 1841)

Deaths
 June 29 – Joseph Emanuel Fischer von Erlach, Austrian architect (born 1693)

References

Architecture
Years in architecture
18th-century architecture